Deposits of coal is found in Tosh, Siuja, Azimara and Abidhara in Dang, and few places in Sallyan, Rolpa, Pyuthan and Palpa districts of Nepal. The total estimated deposit is about 5 million tons. Due to low volume of deposits, mining is done by traditional methods. The mines are exploited since early 1960's to 1990's, however due to lack of proper market, they are not exploited in full capacity.

Deposits
Geologically, the main coal deposits can be categorized into:
 Quaternary Lignite deposits of Kathmandu Valley
 Siwalik coal found in the Sub-Himalayas
 Cretaceous-Eocene coal and Gondwana coal found in the Lesser Himalayas

The coal in the sub-himalaya (Siwalik/Churia) has some radioactive minerals mixed in the coal.

Production
There are 11 small scale coal mines are in operation scattered throughout Nepal.
Some additional licenses are issued by the government for exploration. The annual production is shown in table below.

Environmental concerns
Some lands have started to cave in and some landslides has been triggered near the mining area. Also, the ground water has dried up. This has caused conflict between locals and mine operators.

See also
Mineral resources of Nepal

References

Mining in Nepal